Cameron Tyler Jordan (born July 10, 1989) is an American football defensive end for the New Orleans Saints of the National Football League (NFL). He played college football at California, and was drafted by the Saints in the first round of the 2011 NFL Draft.

High school career
Jordan was born in Chandler, Arizona, the son of former Minnesota Vikings tight end Steve Jordan. He attended Chandler High School in Chandler, Arizona, where he was a two-sport star in football and track for the Chandler Wolves. In football, he earned All-State honors his senior year after registering 85 tackles and 17.5 quarterback sacks. Regarded as a three-star recruit by Rivals.com, Jordan was listed as the #37 strongside defensive end of the class of 2007.

Also an outstanding track & field athlete, Jordan was one of the state's top performers in the discus throw. He captured the state title in the discus at the 2007 5A I State Meet, recording a top-throw of 53.54 meters (175 ft 7 in), while also placing 10th in the shot put event, with a throw of 14.01 meters (45 ft, 11 in).

College career

Jordan primarily played defensive end for the University of California at Berkeley. He was coached by head coach Jeff Tedford and defensive coordinator Bob Gregory. He played in 50 of 51 possible games and made 32 starts at Cal from 2007–10. Jordan achieved honorable mention All-American (Pro Football Weekly) and first-team All-Pac-10 choice as a senior in 2010 after two consecutive honorable mention All-Pac-10 campaigns in 2008 and 2009.

He finished his collegiate career with 175 tackles, while adding 34.0 tackles for loss (-122 yards) and 16.5 sacks (-89 yards) to rank just outside the school's all-time top 10 in each of the latter two categories. He also had one interception that he returned for three yards, five pass breakups, four forced fumbles and five fumble recoveries that he returned for a total of 41 yards and two touchdowns.

Collegiate statistics

Professional career
On January 29, 2011, Jordan played in the 2011 Senior Bowl and was part of Marvin Lewis's North team that lost 24–10 to the South. His overall performance during Senior Bowl practice helped his draft stock and made him a definitive first round pick in the upcoming draft. Jordan attended the NFL Scouting Combine and performed all of the combine and positional drills.

On March 9, 2011, he participated at Cal's pro day, but opted to stand on his combine numbers and only performed defensive end drills. At the conclusion of the pre-draft process, Jordan was projected to be a first round pick by NFL draft experts and scouts. He was ranked as the second best defensive end prospect in the draft by DraftScout.com and Sports Illustrated and was ranked the third best defensive end in the draft by NFL analysts Gil Brandt and Brian Billick.

2011
The New Orleans Saints selected Jordan in the first round (24th overall) of the 2011 NFL Draft. Jordan was the fifth defensive end drafted in 2011, behind J. J. Watt, Robert Quinn, Ryan Kerrigan, and Adrian Clayborn. He was mistakenly called by the Cleveland Browns after the draft ended, who meant to call USC tight-end Jordan Cameron for “Biographical Information”.

On August 2, 2011, the New Orleans Saints signed Jordan to a four-year, $7.73 million contract that includes $6.30 million guaranteed and a signing bonus of $4.12 million.

Jordan entered training camp slated as a starter, but saw competition for his job after the Saints signed veteran free agent Turk McBride. Head coach Sean Payton named Jordan and McBride the starting defensive ends to begin the regular season after Will Smith was suspended for the first two games of the regular season.

He made his professional regular season debut and first career start in the New Orleans Saints' season-opener at the Green Bay Packers and made three combined tackles in their 42–34 loss. Jordan made his first career tackle on running back Ryan Grant and ended a four-yard rush on the opening drive. On October 16, 2011, Jordan collected a season-high six combined tackles in the Saints' 26–20 loss at the Tampa Bay Buccaneers in Week 6. On January 1, 2012, Jordan recorded three combined tackles and made his first career sack during a 45–17 win against the Carolina Panthers in Week 17. Jordan sacked quarterback Cam Newton for a five-yard loss in the second quarter, but was penalized for a horse collar tackle. Jordan finished his rookie season in 2011 with 31 combined tackles (18 solo), four pass deflections, and a sack in 16 games and 15 starts.

The New Orleans Saints finished first in the NFC South with a 13–3 record and earned a playoff berth. On January 7, 2012, Jordan appeared in his first career playoff game and made one tackle in the Saints' 45–28 victory against the Detroit Lions in the Wild Card Round. The following week, Jordan was credited with his first career playoff start. He made six solo tackles and a pass deflection during a 35–32 Divisional Round loss at the San Francisco 49ers.

2012
Defensive coordinator Gregg Williams was not re-signed after the 2011 season and was replaced by former St. Louis Rams' head coach Steve Spagnuolo. Spagnuolo retained Jordan and Will Smith as the starting defensive ends to begin the regular season. Jordan started in the New Orleans Saints' season-opener against the Washington Redskins and collected a season-high 11 combined tackles (six solo) in their 40–32 loss. In Week 9, Jordan made seven combined tackles and a season-high three sacks on quarterback Michael Vick during a 28–13 victory against the Philadelphia Eagles. Jordan also forced a fumble while sacking Michael Vick for a 12-yard loss on the Eagles' opening drive. Jordan started in all 16 games in 2012 and had a career-high 67 combined tackles (41 solo), three pass deflections, eight sacks, three forced fumbles, and two fumble recoveries. The New Orleans Saints finished with a 7–9 record in 2012. Head coach Sean Payton was suspended for the entire season due to the New Orleans Saints bounty scandal.

2013
On January 24, 2013, the New Orleans Saints fired defensive coordinator Steve Spagnuolo after the defense allowed an NFL record 7,042 total yards in 2012. Head coach Sean Payton also announced that the defense would transition to a base 3-4 defense. During the draft, NFL analyst Mike Mayock stated Jordan was better suited to play in a 3-4 defensive alignment. Defensive coordinator Rob Ryan named Jordan and Akiem Hicks the starting defensive ends to begin the regular season, alongside nose tackle Brodrick Bunkley.

On September 15, 2013, he collected a season-high six combined tackles and a sack in the Saints' 16–14 win at the Tampa Bay Buccaneers. In Week 3, Jordan made four combined tackles and had two sacks on Cardinals' quarterback Carson Palmer during a 31–7 victory against the Arizona Cardinals. On November 21, 2013, Jordan tied his season-high of six combined tackles, had a season-high of 2.5 sacks, and deflected a pass in the Saints' 17–13 win at the Atlanta Falcons. On December 27, 2013, Jordan was selected to appear in the 2014 Pro Bowl, which became his first Pro Bowl selection. Jordan started in all 16 games in 2013 and made 47 combined tackles (29 solo), 12.5 sacks, four pass deflections, two forced fumbles, and two fumble recoveries.

The New Orleans Saints finished second in the NFC South with an 11–5 record and earned a Wild Card berth. On January 4, 2014, Jordan made four combined tackles and had 1.5 sacks on quarterback Nick Foles in the Saints' 26–24 victory at the Philadelphia Eagles in the NFC Wild Card Round. The following week, he made six combined tackles and sacked Seahawks' quarterback Russell Wilson during a 23–15 loss at the Seattle Seahawks in the Divisional Round. He was ranked 99th by his fellow players on the NFL Top 100 Players of 2014.

2014
Head coach Sean Payton retained Jordan, Akiem Hicks, and Brodrick Bunkley as the starting defensive line in 2014. In Week 8, Jordan recorded three combined tackles and made a season-high two sacks on quarterback Aaron Rodgers during a 44–23 win against the Green Bay Packers. On November 30, 2014, Jordan made a season-high six combined tackles, a pass deflection, a sack, and made his first career interception in the Saints' 35–32 victory at the Pittsburgh Steelers in Week 13. Jordan intercepted a pass by Steelers' quarterback Ben Roethlisberger, that was originally intended for wide receiver Markus Wheaton, and returned it for a six-yard gain in the third quarter. In Week 17, he collected a season-high six combined tackles and made 1.5 sacks on quarterback Josh McCown in the Saints' 23–20 victory at the Tampa Bay Buccaneers. He started all 16 games in 2014 and finished with 51 combined tackles (32 solo), 7.5 sacks, five passes defensed, and an interception.

2015
On June 2, 2015, the Saints signed Jordan to a five-year, $55 million contract with $33.46 million guaranteed and a signing bonus of $15 million. His contract also includes $22.69 million guaranteed at signing, performance incentives, and a potential opt-out in 2019.

During training camp, the New Orleans Saints switched their base defense to a 4-3 defense. Head coach Sean Payton also labeled Jordan a "Jack linebacker" in his defensive end role. Defensive coordinator Rob Ryan named Jordan and Akiem Hicks the starting defensive ends to start the 2015 regular season, along with defensive tackles John Jenkins and Kevin Williams. On November 16, 2015, the New Orleans Saints fired defensive coordinator Rob Ryan and promoted defensive assistant Dennis Allen to defensive coordinator in his place. Ryan's defense allowed the fourth most points in 2014 and allowed an average of 31.5 points per a game in the Saints' first six games of 2015. On October 15, 2015, Jordan collected a season-high six combined tackles, forced a fumble, and made a season-high three sacks on quarterback Matt Ryan during a 31–21 victory against the Atlanta Falcons in Week 6. The following week, he made two solo tackles and two sacks in the Saints' 27–21 win at the Indianapolis Colts in Week 7. Jordan started in 16 games in 2015 and finished the season with 45 combined tackles (32 solo), ten sacks, five pass deflections, two fumble recoveries, and a forced fumble.

On January 26, 2016, the New Orleans Saints announced that Jordan had been selected to play in the 2016 Pro Bowl as an injury replacement for New England Patriots' defensive end Chandler Jones. He was ranked 99th on the NFL Top 100 Players of 2016 and was named a 2015 Pro Football Focus second-team All-Pro.

2016
Jordan retained his starting defensive end job along with a revamped defensive line that included, Paul Kruger and defensive tackles Tyeler Davison and Nick Fairley. In Week 10, Jordan collected a season-high nine combined tackles and a sack during a 25–23 loss to the Denver Broncos. He started in all 16 games and made 58 combined tackles (40 solo), 7.5 sacks, six pass deflections, and a forced fumble. Pro Football Focus gave Jordan an overall grade of 92.1 and ranked third among all edge rushers in 2016.

2017
Head coach Sean Payton named Jordan and Alex Okafor the starting defensive ends to begin the regular season, along with defensive tackles Tyeler Davison and Sheldon Rankins.

On September 11, 2017, Jordan made four combined tackles, a pass deflection, and a sack in the Saints' 29–19 loss at the Minnesota Vikings. His sack brought his career total to 47.5 sacks, which was enough to surpass Charles Grant as eighth in franchise history. On October 15, 2017, Jordan made four combined tackles, two sacks, and made an interception for his first career touchdown during a 52–38 win against the Detroit Lions in Week 6. Jordan intercepted a pass by quarterback Matthew Stafford, that was originally intended for tight end Eric Ebron, and scored a touchdown in the fourth quarter. His performance against the Lions earned him NFC Defensive Player of the Week. On November 5, 2017, he collected a season-high seven combined tackles and 1.5 sacks during a 30–10 win against the Tampa Bay Buccaneers. He earned NFC Defensive Player of the Month for November. On December 19, 2017, Jordan was selected to the 2018 Pro Bowl, marking the third selection of his career. He started all 16 games and made 62 combined tackles (48 solo), a career-high 13 sacks, 11 pass deflections, two forced fumbles, an interception, and a touchdown. He was named to his third Pro Bowl. He earned First Team All-Pro honors for the first time. Jordan earned an overall grade of 96.2 from Pro Football Focus, which was the highest grade among all qualifying edge rushers in 2017. The Saints finished with a 11-5 record and won the NFC South. In the Wild Card Round against the Carolina Panthers, he had three combined tackles and two passes defensed in the 31–26 victory. In the Divisional Round loss to the Minnesota Vikings, he had two combined tackles in the Minneapolis Miracle. He was ranked 26th by his fellow players on the NFL Top 100 Players of 2018.

2018
In week 2 against the Cleveland Browns, Jordan recorded his first two sacks of the season on Tyrod Taylor during the 21–18 win.
In the following week's game against the Atlanta Falcons, Jordan recorded another two sacks on Matt Ryan during the 43–37 overtime win.
In week 12 against the Falcons on Thanksgiving Day, Jordan recorded another two sacks on Matt Ryan during the 31–17 win.
In week 13 against the Dallas Cowboys on Thursday Night Football, Jordan recorded a season high 7 tackles and sacked Dak Prescott twice.  Jordan's second sack of the game was a strip sack which he recovered also late in the fourth quarter.  Despite Jordan's stellar play, the Saints would go on to lose the game by a score of 13–10.
In the following week's game against the Tampa Bay Buccaneers, Jordan sacked Jameis Winston twice during the 28–14 win.  This was Jordan's third game in a row with two sacks.
In the 2018 season, Jordan had 12 sacks, 49 total tackles, 21 quarterback hits, six passes defensed, and one forced fumble. He earned his fourth career Pro Bowl nomination.

The Saints finished with 13–3 record, won the division, and earned a first-round bye for the playoffs. In the Divisional Round win over the Philadelphia Eagles, Jordan recorded three combined tackles and one pass defensed during the 20–14 win. In the NFC Championship loss to the Los Angeles Rams, Jordan recorded three combined tackles and a quarterback hit during the 26–23 overtime loss. He was ranked 41st by his fellow players on the NFL Top 100 Players of 2019.

2019
On June 11, 2019, the Saints signed Jordan to a three-year, $52.5 million contract extension with $42 million guaranteed, keeping him under contract through the 2023 season. 
In week 1 against the Houston Texans, Jordan recorded his first sack of the season on Deshaun Watson during the 30–28 win. 
In week 2 against the Los Angeles Rams, Jordan sacked and forced a fumble on Jared Goff in the 27–9 loss. In the second quarter, Jordan forced a fumble off Goff and returned it for a touchdown. The referees initially ruled the play an incomplete pass. However, video replay revealed that Jordan forced a fumble, but his return for a touchdown did not count since the play had already been blown dead. After the game, Jordan was furious and referred the referees as "foot locker." In week 6 against the Jacksonville Jaguars, Jordan sacked Gardner Minshew twice during the 13–6 win. A week later against the Chicago Bears, Jordan sacked Mitch Trubisky twice in the 36–25 win which was the Saints' sixth win of the season. In week 13 against the Atlanta Falcons on Thanksgiving Day, Jordan recorded a season high 6 tackles and sacked Matt Ryan 4 times in the 26–18 win. Jordan won the NFC Defensive Player of the Week award for his performance.

Jordan finished the season with 52 combined tackles (38 solo), a career high 15.5 sacks, one fumble recovery, and three pass deflections in 16 games started.
In the Wild Card Round of the playoffs against the Minnesota Vikings, Jordan recorded three tackles and sacked Kirk Cousins once during the 26–20 overtime loss. For his efforts in the 2019 season, Jordan earned his fifth career Pro Bowl nomination. He was ranked 23rd by his fellow players on the NFL Top 100 Players of 2020. He was named to the Pro Football Hall of Team All-Decade Team for the 2010s.

2020
In Week 11 against the Atlanta Falcons, Jordan recorded three sacks on Matt Ryan during the 24–9 win.
In Week 12 against the Denver Broncos, Jordan recorded a sack on wide receiver Kendall Hinton during the 31–3 win.
Jordan was named the NFC Defensive Player of the Month for his performance in November.
In Week 15 against the Kansas City Chiefs, Jordan was ejected from the game after punching Chiefs' guard Andrew Wylie. He was named to the Pro Bowl for the sixth time. He was ranked 46th by his fellow players on the NFL Top 100 Players of 2021.

2021
In Week 15, Jordan had two sacks, five tackles, and a forced fumble in a 9–0 win over the Tampa Bay Buccaneers, earning NFC Defensive Player of the Week. In Week 17, had eight tackles, 3.5 sacks, and three tackles for loss in a 18–10 win over the Panthers, earning his second NFC Defensive Player of the Week honor of the season. He was named to his seventh Pro Bowl for his efforts in the 2021 season. He was ranked 69th by his fellow players on the NFL Top 100 Players of 2022.

2022
On December 10, 2022, the NFL fined Cameron $50,000 for faking an injury in the Week 13 game against the Tampa Bay Buccaneers. In Week 17, Jordan had three sacks, along with a forced fumble and five tackles, becoming the Saints all-time sack leader, surpassing Rickey Jackson, in a 20-10 win over the Eagles, earning NFC Defensive Player of the Week.

NFL career statistics

Personal life
Jordan is a Christian. Jordan is married to Nikki Jordan. They have four children.

Jordan's father, Steve, was a tight end and played 13 years in the NFL with the Minnesota Vikings. His sister is married to Kasim Edebali.

In 2017, Jordan went on a USO tour to visit with American soldiers at bases in the Middle East and southwest Asia.

References

External links
 
 California Golden Bears bio
 New Orleans Saints bio

1989 births
Living people
American football defensive ends
American football defensive tackles
California Golden Bears football players
New Orleans Saints players
Players of American football from Arizona
Sportspeople from Chandler, Arizona
Unconferenced Pro Bowl players
National Conference Pro Bowl players
100 Sacks Club